is a vertical rail shooter video game, developed and published by Sega and was first released on March 26, 1988 in Japan for the Mark III as Gold Cartridge, December 31, 1988 in North America and later in Europe.

Gameplay
Players fight against hundreds of robot warriors equipped with particle beam weapons. The game is played from the bird's eye view. The player's mission is to blast through nine levels of various 3D terrain, shooting aliens and ships on three different planes.

One of the buttons is used to cycle through the three planes. Along the way, there are several bosses that the player has to defeat. The later ones drop a power-up, which the player can use to upgrade the ship. Some of the power-ups include double shots and laser beams. Another power-up gives players an extra ship on their side. The first one joins the fight, later ones go into reserve. Blade Eagle is designed for play in conjunction with the Sega 3-D Glasses.

References

External links

1988 video games
Rail shooters
Master System games
Master System-only games
Video games with stereoscopic 3D graphics
Video games developed in Japan